The Texarkana Gazette is a daily newspaper founded in 1875 and currently owned by WEHCO Media, Inc. It serves a nine-county area surrounding Texarkana.

History
The newspaper was acquired through the consolidation of several newspapers in 1933 through the efforts of Iowa-born businessman Clyde E. Palmer. Palmer established a newspaper and radio station chain that reached into Hot Springs, Camden, Magnolia, and Stuttgart in Arkansas. In 1952, Palmer acquired the television station KCMC, which became KTAL-TV in 1961. It serves both Texarkana and Shreveport. Through a reorganization in 1968, The Camden News in Camden, Arkansas, technically became the parent company for the Palmer newspapers, including the Texarkana Gazette.

Palmer's Texarkana Gazette still circulates in Bowie, Red River, Morris, Marion, Titus, and Cass counties in Texas and Miller, Little River, Hempstead, Nevada, Howard, Sevier, Pike and Columbia counties in Arkansas. Newspapers are also delivered into McCurtain County in the southeastern corner of Oklahoma and into northern Caddo Parish in Louisiana.

The Texarkana Gazette has more than 130 employees and some 120 independent carriers that deliver newspapers in a 60-mile radius. The average circulation is about 25,000 daily. The previous afternoon daily, the Texarkana Daily News, ceased publication in 1978. Rodger Dean Duncan, who later worked for two White House administrations and is now a prominent business consultant, was managing editor of the two Texarkana newspapers in the late 1960s.

Palmer determined the key to newspaper success was the readers, the advertisers, the employees, the creditors, and the stockholders, in that order.

The paper earned the coveted 2010 General Excellence award from the Arkansas Press Association, competing against eight other large dailies, including the Arkansas Democrat-Gazette, which placed second.

For more than 85 years, the main office of the Gazette was located at 315 Pine Street on the Texas side. In September 2016, the Gazette's business, circulation, advertising, creative services, and editorial departments moved to the first two floors of the Landmark Building at 101 E. Broad St. on the Arkansas side, while the printing and distribution remained in the existing building.

On December 12, 2017, the paper announced that it would close its Texarkana printing press in mid-January and begin printing in Little Rock, Arkansas, where sister paper the Arkansas Democrat-Gazette is printed.

Controversy

In September 2013, the paper and editor Les Minor generated controversy when it refused to publish the wedding announcement of a gay couple. "The Texarkana Gazette publishes wedding, engagement and anniversary announcements related to marriages or impending marriages that are recognized by states in which it circulates," Minor said.

Notes

External links
Texarkana Gazette official web site
Texarkana Gazette on Facebook
Texarkana Gazette on Twitter
Texarkana Gazette Sports on Twitter

Daily newspapers published in Texas
Newspapers published in Arkansas
Texarkana
Texarkana, Arkansas
Texarkana, Texas
Publications established in 1875